The National Christian College Athletic Association (NCCAA) is an association of Christian universities, colleges, and Bible colleges in the United States and Canada whose mission is  "the promotion and enhancement of intercollegiate athletic competition with a Christian perspective". The national headquarters is located in Greenville, South Carolina. The NCCAA was formed in 1968. For the 2022–2023 season, the NCCAA listed 90 members, 51 of which participate in Division I and 39 in Division II. Many teams in the NCCAA are also in other athletics associations, including NCAA, NAIA, and ACCA.

The association's sports for men are baseball, basketball, cross country, football, golf, soccer, tennis, and track and field (indoor/outdoor).  Women's sports are basketball, cross country, golf, soccer, softball, tennis, track and field (indoor/outdoor), and volleyball. The NCCAA discontinued men's volleyball and wrestling.

The Victory Bowl is the organization's football championship bowl game.

Sports
The NCAAA sponsors championships in the following sports:

See also
 List of NCCAA institutions
 NCAA
 National Association of Intercollegiate Athletics (NAIA)
 United States Collegiate Athletic Association (USCAA)
 National Junior College Athletic Association (NJCAA)
 California Community College Athletic Association (CCCAA)

References

External links

 
Sports organizations established in 1968
1968 establishments in the United States
College sports governing bodies in the United States
College sports governing bodies in Canada